Shakeel or Shakil is a name of Arabic etymology that means "handsome". It may refer to the following people:

Given name
 Shakil Afridi, a Pakistani physician
 Shakil Ahmed (Major General), Bangladeshi Army personnel
 Shakil Ahmed (footballer, born 1988), Bangladeshi national footballer
 Shakil Ahmed (sport shooter), Bangladeshi sport shooter
 Shakeel Bhat, a Muslim activist
Shakil Kazemi, character in the BBC soap opera EastEnders
 Shakeel Khan (cricketer, born 1952), Pakistani cricketer and umpire
 Shakeel Khan (cricketer, born 1968), Pakistani cricketer
 Mir Shakil-ur-Rahman, a Pakistani businessman
 Shakeel Siddiqui, Pakistani stage comedian

Surname
 Shakeel, IAF officer 
 Chhota Shakeel, Indian mobster
 Mohammad Shakil, Bangladeshi cricketer

See also
 Shaquille (given name)
 

Arabic masculine given names
Arabic-language surnames